The Diary of Merer (also known as Papyrus Jarf) is the name for papyrus logbooks written over 4,500 years ago by Merer, a middle ranking official with the title inspector (sHD). They are the oldest known papyri with text, dating to the 27th year of the reign of pharaoh Khufu during the 4th dynasty.
The text, written with (hieratic) hieroglyphs, mostly consists of lists of the daily activities of Merer and his crew. The most well preserved sections (Papyrus Jarf A and B) document the transportation of white limestone blocks from the Tura quarries to Giza by boat.

Buried in front of man-made-caves that served to store the boats at Wadi al-Jarf on the Red Sea coast, the papyri were found and excavated in 2013 by a French mission under the direction of archaeologists Pierre Tallet of Paris-Sorbonne University and Gregory Marouard.

The Egyptian archaeologist Zahi Hawass describes the Diary of Merer as "the greatest discovery in Egypt in the 21st century." Parts of the papyri are exhibited at the Egyptian Museum in Cairo.

Contents

Papyrus Jarf A and B 
The most intact papyri describe several months of work with the transportation of limestone from quarries Tura North and Tura South to Giza in the 27th year of the reign of pharaoh Khufu. Though the diary does not specify where the stones were to be used or for what purpose, given the diary may date to what is widely considered the very end of Khufu's reign, Tallet believes they were most likely for cladding the outside of the Great Pyramid. About every ten days, two or three round trips were done, shipping perhaps 30 blocks of 2–3 tonnes each, amounting to 200 blocks per month. About forty boatmen worked under him. The period covered in the papyri extends from July to November.

The entries in the logbooks are all arranged along the same line. At the top there is a heading naming the month and the season. Under that there is a horizontal line listing the days of the months. Under the entries for the days, there are always two vertical columns describing what happened on these days (Section B II): [Day 1] The director of 6 Idjeru casts for Heliopolis in a transport boat to bring us food from Heliopolis while the elite is in Tura, Day 2 Inspector Merer spends the day with his troop hauling stones in Tura North; spending the night at Tura North.

The diary also mentions the original name of the Great Pyramid: Akhet-Khufu, meaning "Horizon of Khufu". 

In addition to Merer, a few other people are mentioned in the fragments. The most important is Ankhhaf (half-brother of Pharaoh Khufu), known from other sources, who is believed to have been a prince and vizier under Khufu and/or Khafre. In the papyri he is called a nobleman (Iry-pat) and overseer of Ra-shi-Khufu. The latter place was the harbour at Giza where Tallet believes the casing stones were transported.

Papyrus Jarf C 
Building a "double djadja" in the central Delta

Papyrus Jarf D 
Work for the Residence and the Valley Temple (?) of Khufu

Other papyri 
Other logbooks (E and F) and associated accounts (G to L and other fragments) are much more fragmentary and their contents have yet to be deciphered and/or published.

References

Bibliography

 

 

2013 archaeological discoveries
26th-century BC works
Fourth Dynasty of Egypt
Egyptian papyri
Egyptian Museum